WeTab (initially announced as WePad) is a MeeGo-based tablet computer announced by German producer Neofonie in April 2010.

The specifics include an 11.6" TN-panel touch screen (1366×768 resolution), a 1.66 GHz Intel Atom N450 processor with fan, 16 GB NAND memory and a total weight of the device of an announced , but actually .

Most media coverage in relation to the WeTab took place in German. WeTab GmbH began mass marketing in September 2010.

Retailers of the device are Amazon.de and German electronics retail giant Media Markt.

The WeTab runs the Linux-based MeeGo operating system and thus can execute native Linux programs, additionally Adobe AIR applications work. Android apps are supported via Virtual Machine.

Technical specifications

See also 
 ExoPC - A Canadian Slate Tablet PC with similar OEM hardware, uses Windows 7 as its OS with a custom UI.
 Tablet PC

References

External links 
 http://wetab.mobi/

Tablet computers
Linux-based devices